The 2022 Guaranteed Rate Bowl was a college football bowl game played on December 27, 2022, at Chase Field in Phoenix, Arizona. The 33rd annual Guaranteed Rate Bowl, the game featured Oklahoma State from the Big 12 Conference and Wisconsin from the Big Ten Conference. The game began at 8:25 p.m. MST and was aired on ESPN. It was one of the 2022–23 bowl games concluding the 2022 FBS football season. The game's title sponsor was residential mortgage company Guaranteed Rate.

Teams
The bowl has conference tie-ins with the Big 12 and Big Ten, who supplied Oklahoma State and Wisconsin, respectively, for this game. This was the first time that the Badgers and Cowboys faced each other.  Oklahoma State had twice appeared in this bowl (in December 2007 and January 2015) and Wisconsin once before (in December 1996). The teams had won each of their previous appearances in this bowl.

Oklahoma State

Oklahoma State finished their regular season with a 7–5 record, 4–5 in conference play. They opened the season with five consecutive wins, and were ranked as high as No. 7, but then lost five of their remaining seven games. The Cowboys faced four ranked opponents, defeating Baylor and Texas while losing to TCU and Kansas State.

Wisconsin

Wisconsin compiled a 6–6 regular-season record, going 4–5 in conference play. They faced one ranked opponent during the season, losing to Ohio State on September 24.

Game summary

Statistics

References

Guaranteed Rate Bowl
Guaranteed Rate Bowl
Guaranteed Rate Bowl
Guaranteed Rate Bowl
Oklahoma State Cowboys football bowl games
Wisconsin Badgers football bowl games